Evelyn Reed (31 October 1905 – 1979) was an American communist and women's rights activist.

In January 1940, she traveled to Mexico to see the exiled Russian Revolutionary Leon Trotsky and his wife Natalia Sedova. There, at the house of Trotsky in Coyoacán, Reed met the American Trotskyist leader James P. Cannon, leader of the Socialist Workers Party (United States). Reed joined in the same year, and remained a leading party member until her death.

An active participant in the women's liberation movement of the 1960s and 1970s, Reed was a founding member of the Women's National Abortion Action Coalition in 1971. During these years she spoke and debated on women's rights in cities throughout the United States, Canada, Australia, New Zealand, Japan, Ireland, the United Kingdom and France.

Inspired by the works on women and the family by Friedrich Engels and Alexandra Kollontai, Reed is the author of many books on Marxist feminism and the origin of the oppression of women and the fight for their emancipation. Some of the most notable works by Reed are: Problems of Women's Liberation, Woman's Evolution: From Matriarchal Clan to Patriarchal Family, Is Biology Woman's Destiny?, and Cosmetics, Fashions, and the Exploitation of Women (with Joseph Hansen and Mary-Alice Waters).

She was nominated as a candidate for President of the United States for the Socialist Workers Party in the 1972 United States presidential election. On the ballot in only three states (Indiana, New York, and Wisconsin), Reed received a total of 13,878 votes. The main Socialist Workers candidate was Linda Jenness, who received 52,799 votes.

Quote

References

External links
Pathfinder Books, Publisher of the Socialist Workers Party and the works of Evelyn Reed
The Lubitz TrotskyanaNet provides a bio-bibliographical sketch of Evelyn Reed
Evelyn Reed Archive at Marxists.org

1905 births
1979 deaths
American activists
American feminist writers
Feminist studies scholars
Female candidates for President of the United States
Marxist feminists
American Marxist writers
Socialist Workers Party (United States) presidential nominees
Candidates in the 1972 United States presidential election
20th-century American politicians
American socialist feminists